The Los Angeles Theatre Center is an institution in Los Angeles, which is operated by the Latino Theater Company.

In January 2006, the Latino Theater Company won a lease to operate The Los Angeles Theatre Center for 20 years and got a $4 million grant from the California Cultural and Historical Endowment to renovate the building. In October 2007, the building was re-opened as the new Los Angeles Theatre Center.

References 

Culture of Los Angeles
Buildings and structures in Los Angeles
2007 establishments in California